The London School of Theology (LST), formerly London Bible College, is a British interdenominational evangelical theological college based in Northwood within the London Borough of Hillingdon.

History

During the 1930s A. J. Vereker, secretary of the Crusaders' Union, Sir John Laing and others set up a meeting to propose a Bible college in London which would provide high quality academic training for Christian teachers in the City. The initial meeting, in May 1939, was followed by a larger one with greater representation, which set the vision and plans for the college.

Subsequent meetings that year, which included preacher Dr. D. Martyn Lloyd Jones, drew up a report which included an outline of the fundamentals of the college.  It would be residential for 40 (expanding to 80) places with a possibility of including evening students. It aimed for its courses to be recognised by London University.

The 1939 outbreak of World War II put the plans temporarily on hold.  The conveners resumed in early 1942 among a wider group of evangelical leaders. In October a doctrinal basis for the college was agreed.  In November "The Bible College Council" was founded:

In March 1943, Graham Scroggie was invited to be the director of the college for the duration of the war, and to preside over teaching matters. Laing provided "generous financial help", and the council of All Nations College gifted £200. In the autumn of that year, the first lectures and classes were held in Eccleston Hall, which marks "the beginning of the public activities of the college".

By 1944, over 300 students were enrolled, and two years later the number was up to 1,400.

In 1970 the college moved to Northwood on a campus previously occupied by the London College of Divinity (or London School of Divinity), an Anglican institution. The 1990s saw the opening of a new postgraduate centre, the Guthrie Centre, which had formerly housed the Centre for Islamic Studies.

In 2004 the name of the college was changed to the London School of Theology.

Staff members
Its faculty has included New Testament scholars Donald Guthrie, R. T. France, Ralph P. Martin and Max Turner as well as Derek Tidball, a practical theologian and sociologist of religion. LST also had strong connections with the Anglican theologian John Stott, an important supporter and former council member of the college.

Principals
1946–1965 – Ernest Kevan
1966–1980 – Gilbert Kirby
1980–1989 – Michael Griffiths
1989–1995 – Peter Cotterell
1995–2007 – Derek Tidball
2007–2008 – Anna Robbins (acting)
2008–2010 – Simon Steer
2010–2012 – Chris Jack (acting)
2012–2016 – No principal, senior leadership team model used
2017–2019 – Calvin Samuel
2019–2019 – Graham Twelftree (acting)
2019–present – Mark J. Cartledge

Presidents
2014 – June 2016: Krish Kandiah

Notable alumni

 Jeremy Balfour
 Alistair Begg
 Clive Calver
 Ruth Edwards
 Dan Forshaw
 Graham Kendrick Honorary Doctorate
 Sheila Walsh

Notes

References

External links
London School of Theology website
LST Library catalogue

 
Bible colleges, seminaries and theological colleges in England
Education in the London Borough of Hillingdon
Educational institutions established in 1941
Universities and colleges in London
1941 establishments in England
Professional education in London
Christianity in London